The Providence, Warren and Bristol Railroad (also known as the Bristol Secondary) was a railroad in the state of Rhode Island that connected the city of Providence with Bristol, Rhode Island.  The company was formed in 1854 by merging the Providence, Warren and Bristol Railroad Companies of Massachusetts and Rhode Island. The 14.1-mile line itself was completed on July 12, 1855.

All rail operations ceased on the line in 1976; most of the former right-of-way is now the East Bay Bike Path.

History 

The Boston and Providence Railroad originally terminated their 1835 mainline at India Point on an alignment that presently exists as the East Junction Branch; this line would officially become a branch in 1847 with the opening of the new B&P mainline from East Junction to Providence. In 1848, Union Station opened in the center of Providence; it became the Boston & Providence's main terminal and the facilities along the harbor were used thereafter mainly for freight. In 1855, the Providence, Warren and Bristol Railroad opened as a Bristol extension of the India Point Branch along the eastern bank of the Seekonk River.

The line had originally crossed state boundaries when it had first opened; a portion of the line ran through the town of Seekonk, Massachusetts.  The area of Seekonk that banked the Seekonk River was reincorporated as East Providence, Rhode Island as part of a boundary settlement between the two states in 1862; this would position the PW&B right-of-way entirely within the boundary of Rhode Island.

In 1865, the Fall River, Warren and Providence Railroad built a branch off the line at Warren. The two lines were related to the Boston & Providence and Old Colony, their connections at East Providence and Fall River, respectively. Full ownership of each was acquired in 1872 by the Boston & Providence which sold the Fall River, Warren & Providence to the Old Colony the next year.

In 1888 the Old Colony leased the B&P and thereby put the two "Warren" lines under one management.  On July 1, 1891, the line was leased to the Old Colony Railroad for 99 years. Later in 1893, the PW&B was absorbed into the New York, New Haven and Hartford Railroad, upon its lease of the Old Colony Railroad system.  During this time, PW&B trains reached a Providence depot near Fox Point using the B&P's India Point bridge.

Route 
The PW&B's northern terminus was at India Point, where it branched from the New Haven Railroad (now the Northeast Corridor); this junction formed a wye on the east side of the Seekonk River, with the southern leg being the PW&B mainline. From there, the line ran through East Providence then through Riverside, Barrington, and Warren with double track between Providence and Warren, a distance of 10 miles. From Warren, the line split into two single-track branches; one going east to Fall River via the Slade's Ferry swing bridge, the other to the railroad's southern terminus at Bristol, Rhode Island.

Providence's Union Station was located just west of the PW&B's northern terminus. Attempts were made to run full size freight cars over the trolley tracks to Union Station, which resulted in frequent derailments. This issue prompted the construction of the Crook Point Bascule Bridge along with a mile-long tunnel under Providence’s east side known as the East Side Railroad Tunnel; both the tunnel, bridge, and a downtown viaduct were completed in 1908.

Electrification 
Under the New Haven, the PW&B line was one of the few electrified heavy-rail lines in New England outside of Massachusetts and Connecticut at the time.  The overhead was a standard 600 Volt DC single-wire trolley system; the self-propelled cars used trolley poles as opposed to pantographs. Due to the high frequency of the route (headways were projected to be eight to ten minutes), the line could be considered the only rapid transit service to exist in Rhode Island.

To handle peak rush-hour power demands, two battery stations were built close to the Providence & Fall River ends of the line; off-peak, the batteries were "float-charged" by the power plant in Warren. During rush hour periods, the battery stations would pick up some of the load, easing the burden on the powerhouse.  Most of the former steam-service coaches were converted into self-propelled units.  Under electrification, the line operated similarly to an interurban service with the unique distinction that it utilized heavy-rail equipment.

Decline 

Although the line was well patronized and service was frequent for many years, growing automobile ownership doomed the line.  All rail service to Fall River was ceased after a ship struck and caused irreparable damage to the Slade’s Ferry Bridge in 1932; the bridge would then be converted for automobile traffic only.  That same year, electrified passenger service was cut-back before being entirely ceased in 1934. Passenger service was switched over to gas-electric cars until all passenger service ended in 1938 following the Hurricane of 1938.

Freight and excursion services continued for the next three decades. NYNH&H successor Penn Central took control of the line in 1969. In 1970, PC requested ICC permission to abandon the line due to low freight demand. Conrail inherited the line from PC the same year, and further attempts were made to rail-bank the right-of-way. The newly independent Providence and Worcester Railroad assumed operations of the line in 1976; however, the entire line from East Providence to Bristol was abandoned the same year. The Crook Point Bascule bridge and the East Side Tunnel were subsequently abandoned later that year; the viaduct was demolished when the Northeast Corridor was re-routed to facilitate remodeling of the downtown area in Providence in the early 1980s.

After 1976, the short mile-long East Providence portion of the line could only be accessed via the East Junction Branch or East Providence Branch. Freight would continue to service a scrapyard at Wilkesbarre Pier until the early 2000s; by 2006, this portion had been abandoned by the P&W.

Commuter rail proposals 
Before the line’s full abandonment, the Rhode Island Department of Transportation briefly considered restoring passenger service to the PW&B right-of-way as a state-subsidized commuter rail line within a 1981 transit study that evaluated options to realign the Northeast Corridor. The commuter line, referred within the study as East Side Rail Transit, would have operated commuter trains between Providence Union Station and Bristol via the East Side Tunnel. Proposed intermediate stations were East Providence, West Barrington, Barrington and Warren. In Providence, the East Side line would have met another commuter line that would have ran between Providence and Davisville along the Northeast Corridor. The study also proposed other alternatives such as a shorter East Side light rail alignment. RIDOT would demolish the downtown Providence viaduct during the re-routing of the Northeast Corridor later in the 1980s; this permanently severed the East Side Tunnel from the Northeast Corridor and precluded the option for the future implementation of commuter rail or light rail.

The restoration of passenger rail on the Bristol Secondary was studied in 1994 as a part of a larger state rail corridor feasibility study. The purpose of the study was to determine the potential for the use of the existing or rail-banked railroad rights-of-way for public transportation facilities and services. Restoration of the Bristol Secondary for commuter rail service was evaluated to cost $72.72 million with a total annual operating cost of $13.92 million; it was estimated the line would attract 2,900-4,300 daily riders. The study acknowledged that rail restoration to Bristol would need to accommodate the existing rail-trail; the route would also need to utilize the East Junction Branch in Attleboro to access the line.  Another proposal indicated the construction of a new rail bridge across Mount Hope Bay to connect the Bristol Secondary to the Newport Secondary; light rail alternatives were also considered for the line. Ultimately, none of the rail service proposals from the 1994 study would ever be funded or approved.

Conversion to rail trail 

In 1992, most of the PW&B right-of-way opened as the East Bay Bike Path.  Where the right-of-way was double tracked, the bike path occupies one of the main lines; the parallel main line and remaining trackage are occasionally visible running alongside the paved bikeway. The track passes the original station in Riverside, which is now used as a café.

The Crook Point Bascule Bridge permanently remains in an open up-right position; the catenary structures on the bridge span remain one of the only remnants of the line’s former electrification.  The East Side Tunnel portals have since been sealed.  Multiple proposals have since been made to repurpose the tunnel and bridge as part of a BRT or light-rail line. A more recent plan in 2021 involved converting the area around the bridge into a park; however, that plan has since been subsequently abandoned.

Station list

Gallery

See also 
 East Bay Bike Path
 Railroads in Rhode Island
 Railroad electrification in the US
 List of Old Colony Railroad stations

References

External links

 

Old Colony Railroad lines
Predecessors of the New York, New Haven and Hartford Railroad
1854 establishments in Rhode Island
Railway services introduced in 1854